The Ecdeiocoleaceae comprise a family of flowering plants with two genera and three species. The botanical name has rarely been recognized by taxonomists.

The APG II system, in 2003 (unchanged from the APG system, 1998), does recognize such a family, and assigns it to the order Poales in the clade commelinids, in the monocots. Three species in two genera,  Ecdeiocolea and Georgeantha, both endemic to Southwest Australia, have been described to date.

References

External links
Ecdeiocoleaceae in L. Watson and M.J. Dallwitz (1992 onwards). The families of flowering plants: descriptions, illustrations, identification, information retrieval. Version: 27 April 2006. https://web.archive.org/web/20070103200438/http://delta-intkey.com/.
Ecdeiocolea monostachya: distribution map
Georgeantha hexandra: distribution map 

Angiosperms of Western Australia
Poales of Australia
Plant families endemic to Australia
Poales families
Poales
Endemic flora of Southwest Australia